HNX may refer to:

Heartneix, Full name Priyanshu Singh Ayodhya Ethical hacker India, Singapore
Heartneix Jadugar (Rubik) , Ethical Hacking, Software Developer, Heartneix Rajpoot
INSTAGRAM - priyanshuhnx